Lassina Jean Apollinaire Junior Dao  (20 December 1996) is an Ivorian professional footballer who plays as a forward, most recently for Pyunik.

Career
In June 2016, Dao signed for FC Aktobe, but left a couple of months later.

On 2 April 2019, Dao signed for Pyunik. On 1 June 2019, Dao was released by Pyunik.

Career statistics

Club

References

External links
 

1996 births
Living people
Ivorian footballers
Association football forwards
Ivorian expatriate footballers
Expatriate footballers in Moldova
Expatriate footballers in Kazakhstan
Expatriate footballers in Israel
Expatriate footballers in Belarus
Expatriate footballers in Armenia
Ivorian expatriate sportspeople in Kazakhstan
Ivorian expatriate sportspeople in Israel
Ivorian expatriate sportspeople in Moldova
Ivorian expatriate sportspeople in Armenia
Kazakhstan Premier League players
Israeli Premier League players
FC Saxan players
CSF Bălți players
FC Aktobe players
Hapoel Ashkelon F.C. players
Bnei Sakhnin F.C. players
FC Gomel players
FC Pyunik players